The Motyl (Polish: "Butterfly") was an early Polish glider constructed by the Poznań Aviation Circle of the Heavy machinery School under the supervision of Michal Bohattrew. The Motyl was entered in the Second Polish Glider Contest, held in 1925, at Oksywie near Gdynia on the Baltic coast, with contest number 20, piloted by Gorzke. The Motyl had a span of 10m (32 ft 9¾in), length of 6.7 m (22 ft), wing area of 17m2 (183 ft2) and an aspect ratio of 5.9 with a plywood covered rectangular section fuselage. Little is known of its achievements or detail of the structure.

References

 Taylor, J. H. (ed) (1989) Jane's Encyclopedia of Aviation. Studio Editions: London. p. 29
 Cynk, Jerzy B.. “Polish Aircraft 1893 – 1939”. London, Putnam. 1971. 

1920s Polish sailplanes
Aircraft first flown in 1925